Farkhod Oripov (born April 9, 1984) is a Tajik former swimmer, who specialized in sprint freestyle events. Oripov qualified for the men's 100 m freestyle at the 2000 Summer Olympics in Sydney, by receiving a Universality place from FINA without meeting a standard entry time. He participated in an unprecedented first heat against two other swimmers Karim Bare of Niger and Eric Moussambani of Equatorial Guinea, later dubbed himself as Eric the Eel. Before the race began, Oripov plunged into the pool, along with Bare, beating the gun, and were eventually disqualified for a false start, leaving Moussambani as the last man standing.

References

External links

1984 births
Living people
Tajikistani male freestyle swimmers
Olympic swimmers of Tajikistan
Swimmers at the 2000 Summer Olympics